Everything for a Woman (German: Alles um eine Frau) is a 1935 German drama film directed by Alfred Abel and starring Gustav Diessl, Charlotte Susa and Harry Frank. It was shot at the EFA Studios in Berlin's Halensee.

Cast
 Gustav Diessl as 	Frederic Keyne, Flugzeuginsustrieller
 Charlotte Susa as 	Blanche, seine Frau
 Harry Frank as 	Chefingenieur Thompson in den Keynewerken
 Hans Kettler as 	Chefpilot Stevens in den Keynewerken
 Paul Hartmann as 	Heinrich Droop, Besitzer einer Tankstelle
 Willi Schur as 	Krüger, sein Monteur
 Olaf Fjord as 	Henry Durand, ein Tänzer
 Hubert von Meyerinck as 	Maxwell, ein dunkler Ehrenmann
 Gerhard Bienert as 	Tim, ein verkrachter Artist
 Albert Hörrmann as Tom, ein verkrachter Artist
 Anna Müller-Lincke as Frau Winter
 Carsta Löck as Mary, ihre Tochter

References

Bibliography
 Klaus, Ulrich J. Deutsche Tonfilme: Jahrgang 1933. Klaus-Archiv, 1988.
 Rentschler, Eric. The Ministry of Illusion: Nazi Cinema and Its Afterlife. Harvard University Press, 1996.
 Waldman, Harry. Nazi Films in America, 1933-1942. McFarland, 2008.

External links 
 

1935 films
Films of Nazi Germany
German drama films
1935 drama films
1930s German-language films
German black-and-white films
1930s German films
Films directed by Alfred Abel
Films shot at Halensee Studios